Davoren Park is a suburb at the northern extent of the Adelaide metropolitan area, South Australia in the City of Playford. The suburb was formed as part of a merger between Elizabeth Field and the northern part of Elizabeth West on 11 November 1993. It is named after the Davoren family, who were early pioneers of the area.

The Playford North Urban Renewal project to expand and upgrade the area commenced in 2007 and is expected to take 10–15 years. The project focuses on the Peachey Belt (an unofficial designation roughly comprising Davoren Park, Smithfield and Smithfield Plains), which has been identified as a disadvantaged area.

In popular culture 

 Davoren Park is featured prominently in the second season of the Australian political thriller Secret City.

See also
 City of Playford
 List of Adelaide suburbs

References 

Suburbs of Adelaide